Montgomery Air National Guard Base is the home base of the Alabama Air National Guard 187th Fighter Wing.

History
The base has previously been known as Gunter Army Airfield Auxiliary #6 and is still sometimes known as Dannelly Field.

The roots of the 187th Fighter Wing date back to 1952 when the Alabama Air National Guard organized the 160th Tactical Reconnaissance Squadron in Birmingham, Alabama equipped with the RF-51 Mustang. The squadron moved to Dannelly Field on January 1, 1953, and entered the jet age with the arrival of the RF-80 Shooting Star in 1955. Within a year the 160th transitioned to the RF-84 Thunderflash aircraft, which served as the squadron's primary aircraft for the next 15 years.

The squadron was mobilized during the Berlin Crisis in 1961-1962 and deployed to Toul-Rosieres Air Base, France. In August 1962, the squadron returned to normal peacetime status and was reorganized. It was then officially designated the 187th Reconnaissance Group.

In 1971, the Thunderflash was replaced by the RF-4C Phantom II, which was flown for 17 years. From 1971 to 1982, the group remained in the reconnaissance role. The 187th won many honors during this timeframe, including the best reconnaissance unit in the nation in the Photo Finish "81" competition.

In 1982, the 187th changed missions from reconnaissance to the multi-purpose fighter role after acquiring the F-4D. The Group established itself as a premier tactical fighter unit by capturing overall top honors in the ANG Fangsmoke competition in 1987. In October 1988, the Group converted to the F-16 aircraft. In October 1995, the Group was designated a Wing under Air Force reorganization; becoming the 187th Fighter Wing.

Based units 
Flying and notable non-flying units based at Montgomery Air National Guard Base include the following.

Units marked GSU are Geographically Separate Units, which although based at Montgomery, are subordinate to a parent unit based at another location.

United States Air Force 
Air National Guard

 Alabama Air National Guard
 187th Fighter Wing (host wing)
 187th Operations Group
 100th Fighter Squadron – F-16C/D Fighting Falcon
 187th Maintenance Group
 Aircraft Maintenance Squadron
 187th Medical Group
 187th Mission Support Group
 Mission Support Group
 Civil Engineering
 Communications Squadron
 Force Support Squadron
 Logistics Readiness Squadron
 Security Forces Squadron

Air Combat Command

 Ninth Air Force
 20th Fighter Wing
 495th Fighter Group
 377th Fighter Squadron (GSU) – F-16C Fighting Falcon

Future 
In April 2020, the Air Force announced that the F-35A Lighting II would be based at Montgomery ANGB, with the 187th Fighter Wing receiving its first aircraft in 2023.

References

Installations of the United States Air Force in Alabama
Airfields of the United States Army Air Forces in Alabama
Installations of the United States Air National Guard
Buildings and structures in Montgomery, Alabama
Transportation buildings and structures in Montgomery County, Alabama